Space Cats is a 1991–1992 animated television series (with some live-action puppetry sequences) created by Paul Fusco, that aired on Saturday mornings on NBC. It is a comedy show about alien felines helping mankind.

Charles Nelson Reilly made brief but memorable appearances in each episode as D.O.R.C.

Plot
The Space Cats come from a planet called Trygliceride-7, ruled by a being named D.O.R.C. (short for Disembodied Omnipotent Ruler of Cats) which can be described as a disembodied, bespectacled, human head with a funny voice. The Space Cats station themselves on Earth in an underground base with a garbage can as its only access. A live-action segment is shown, where various Space Cats are seen on duty.

D.O.R.C. describes each mission to the team's leader Captain Catgut. The animated segment is then shown where Captain Catgut sends the team of Tom, Scratch and Sniff out to work. At the end of each episode, the group gives the viewers a moral, then wrap up the episode vocalizing the Charge music and shouting out their team name. This was spoofed, when one Space Cat says the moral is for kids to stop watching TV and go read a book, the other two angrily remark that if that is taken seriously it would result in their own cancellation!

Episodes

Cast

Principal voice actors
 Townsend Coleman as Scratch
 Pat Fraley as Sniff
 Rob Paulsen as Thomas 'Tom' Spacecat, Chelsie Pipshire
 Robert Ridgely as Narrator

Live-action segment
 Paul Fusco - Captain Catgut (puppeteer and voice)
 Charles Nelson Reilly - D.O.R.C.
 Lisa Buckley, Bob Fappiano, Allan Trautman, Phil Baron, Blake Buckley - additional Space Cats

Additional voices
 Jack Angel -
 Gregg Berger - 
 Sheryl Bernstein - 
 Susan Blu - 
 Hamilton Camp - 
 Cam Clarke - 
 Jennifer Darling - 
 Walker Edmiston - 
 Jeannie Elias - 
 John Erwin - 
 Lea Floden - 
 Brad Garrett - 
 Barry Gordon - 
 Pat Musick - Dementia DeFortino (in "Mirror, Mirror on the Wall")
 Jan Rabson - 
 Hal Rayle - 
 Maggie Roswell - 
 Susan Silo - 
 Kath Soucie - Yvette Meow, Lollipop (in "Mirror, Mirror on the Wall")
 John Stephenson - 
 Lennie Weinrib -

Crew
 Susan Blu - Animation Dialogue Director
 Jamie Simone - Dialogue Editor
 Shuki Levy - Original Music

References

External links

1991 American television series debuts
1992 American television series endings
1990s American animated television series
1990s American comic science fiction television series
American children's animated comic science fiction television series
American children's animated space adventure television series
American television shows featuring puppetry
American television series with live action and animation
Animated television series about cats
English-language television shows
NBC original programming
Television series by Marvel Productions
Television series created by Paul Fusco